Duplus was a diving support and sample drilling ship for the petrol industry. She was designed and built for use in the North Sea towards the end of the 1960s. Most probably, she was the world's first ship built to the SWATH design principle. After two years of trials and initial use, she was rebuilt into a hybrid form between SWATH ship and catamaran.

History
Duplus was designed by the Dutch construction office Trident Offshore. She was built as hull #1033 at Boele's Scheepswerf & Machienefabriek N.V. in Bolnes, Netherlands. In 1969, she was launched and sea trials started. The owners, the Netherlands Offshore Company (original name Nederlandse Maatschappij voor Werken Buitengaats), expected her experimental concept to deliver a usability in rough seas greater than what was known of single-[hull] ships.
Starting in 1969, Duplus was active in the North Sea for 15 years, performing duty as a diving support ship, for drilling seabed samples and as a standby vessel. After a sale to McDermott, Inc. in 1980, she was renamed to Jaramac 57 and registered in Panama. In 1984, she was sold to International Underwater Contractors and renamed to Twin Drill. Under this name, she was active in the Gulf of Mexico for another ten years. After being laid up for an extended period, she was broken up in Mobile, AL in 2004.

References
 Boele-Bolnes launch twin-hull craft for offshore work. In: Holland Shipbuilding. vol. 17 (1968), Nr. 9 (November), pg. 58
 Tewaterlating Catamaran "Duplus". In: Schip en Werf de Zee. Nr. 25, vol. 35 (1968), pg. 577
 Twin-Hull vessel "Duplus" for Netherlands Offshore Company. In: Holland Shipbuilding. vol. 17 (1969), Nr. 12 (February), pg. 54-60
 Jan L. Arps (Trident Offshore Co.): The Role of the Semi-Submersible Work Vessel In Offshore Production Operations.; Fifth Annual Offshore Technology Conference. Houston, TX., USA. 29. April 29 - 2. Mai 1973
 Oilman's support fleet. In: Design, London, UK, . Nr. 296, August 1973, pg. 44-45
 Hull aids Gulf Exploration. In: Popular Mechanics. August 1985, pg. 65
 Duplus - the first Dutch SWATH. In: Schip en Werf de Zee. December 2004, pg. 19

Small waterplane area twin hull vessels
Ships built in the Netherlands
1969 ships